Wei Liucheng ( born August 1946) is a Chinese businessman and politician. He is the former Governor and Communist Party Secretary of Hainan province. In August 2011, Wei became one of the deputy chairs of the Committee on the Economy and Finance in the National People's Congress.

Biography
Born in Biyang County, Henan, Wei graduated from Beijing Petroleum Institute then worked in China's petroleum industry for more than 30 years. In 1982 he joined the China National Offshore Oil Corporation and in 1998 was appointed general manager.

Wei moved to Hainan in October 2003, and was appointed Governor of Hainan in February 2004. He served in that position until February 2007  when he was appointed as secretary of the Hainan Provincial Committee of the Communist Party of China (CPC) Committee. He was re-elected by the Hainan People's Congress on January 29, 2008.

Wei was an alternate member of 16th CPC Central Committee, and is a current member of 17th Central Committee.

References

Living people
1946 births
Governors of Hainan
Politicians from Zhumadian
People's Republic of China politicians from Henan